Out of Control is a 2003 Indian Hindi-language romantic comedy film which stars Riteish Deshmukh, Hrishitaa Bhatt and American actress and model Brande Roderick.

Plot
Jaswinder (Ritesh Deshmukh) goes to the United States, promising his parents that he will return soon and his sister's marriage will be set. In America, he meets an American girl named Sally (Brande Roderick) and marries her for his visa.

He obviously forgets the promise he made to his parents. Meanwhile, in India his parents have found him a new bride, Richa (Hrishitaa Bhatt). His sister calls him to India by telling him that their father has had a heart attack. He returns to India and to his astonishment he gets engaged to Richa.

He strongly detests the idea but marries her and escapes to the United States and tells Sally that everything and everyone was fine in India. Back in India, his parents are amazed at his behaviour and Richa is surprised that her husband left soon after marriage, as he was supposed to take her to New York. Jaswinder's father (Amrish Puri) and Richa follow him to New York. As they reach New York, they are met by Flower (Satish Shah) who tells and inspires Richa to become a modern girl in her appearance. Jaswinder doesn't tolerate her and soon chucks her out. Sally does not know anything about this. But after some time, Jaswinder ends up falling in love with Richa and does not want to be separated from her. Will Sally find out? Will Jaswinder and Richa end up leading a happy life in the end? This plot forms the rest of the story.

Cast
Riteish Deshmukh as Jaswinder / Jimmy
Hrishitaa Bhatt as Richa Bedi
Brande Roderick as Sally 
Anand Raj Anand
Amrish Puri as Jatta Singh Bedi
Satish Shah as Flower
Satish Kaushik as Mango Singh
Kenneth Mergen as Philip J. Roberts

Soundtrack
All songs are written by Dev Kohli.

Reception 
Taran Adarsh of Bollywood Hungama opined that "On the whole, OUT OF CONTROL is a decent entertainer that will attract cinegoers in good numbers initially". A critic from Rediff.com said that "The film reeks of that 'been there, done that' feeling".

References

External links 
 

2003 films
2000s Hindi-language films
Films set in the United States
Films scored by Anand Raj Anand